Yusuke Inaba (稲場 悠介, Inaba Yūsuke, born 11 April 2000) is a Japanese water polo player. He competed in the 2020 Summer Olympics.

References

2000 births
Living people
People from Toyama (city)
Water polo players at the 2020 Summer Olympics
Japanese male water polo players
Olympic water polo players of Japan
Expatriate water polo players
Japanese expatriate sportspeople in Romania
Asian Games silver medalists for Japan
Asian Games medalists in water polo
Water polo players at the 2018 Asian Games
Medalists at the 2018 Asian Games
21st-century Japanese people